Paolo Monti (11 August 1908 – 29 November 1982) was an Italian photographer, known for his architectural photography.

In his early period, Monti experimented with abstractionism as well as with effects such as blurring and diffraction. In 1953, he became a professional photographer. He mainly worked with architecture reproductions which were used by magazines and book editors for illustration. Starting from 1966, Monti catalogued historic centers of Italian cities.

Early life and education

Monti was born in Novara. His father was a banker and amateur photographer from Val d'Ossola. His family moved several times as his father was transferred between small towns. He attended Bocconi University in Milan and graduated in Economics in 1930.

Life and work
After graduation he worked for a few years in the Piedmont region. His father died in 1936 and shortly afterwards Paolo married Maria Binotti.

From 1939 to 1945 he lived in Mestre near Venice, then moved to Venice proper where he worked at the Regional Agricultural Cooperative and continued his hobby of photography.

In his early period, Monti experimented with abstractionism as well as with effects such as blurring and diffraction. He helped found the club La Gondola in 1947 which shortly became a feature of the international avant-garde photography movement. In 1953 Monti became a professional photographer, working mainly with magazines in the field of architecture and design. He helped illustrate over 200 volumes on cities and regions, architects and artists.

Starting in about 1965 he photographed illustrations for the history of Italian literature and also photographed Apennine valleys including the region of Emilia-Romagna. Later his photography related to Italian art history. After 1980 he concentrated on photographically documenting the heritage of Novara, Lake Orta and Val d'Ossola. For this work, in 1981 he was awarded a national Umberto Zanotti Bianco Prize.

Death and legacy
Monti died in Milan on 29 November 1982.

His archive has been declared of notable historical interest by the Italian Ministry of Cultural Heritage and Activities in 2004 and was acquired by the BEIC Foundation in 2008, catalogued and opened to the public.

Publications

Paolo Monti. Milan: Gruppo Editoriale Fabbri, 1983. . Text by Antonio Arcari.
Paolo Monti: Fotografo di Brunelleschi: le Architetture Fiorentine. Casalecchio di Reno, Bologna: Grafis, 1986. . Edited by Franco Bonilauri. With an essay by Salvatore Di Pasquale, "Filippo Brunelleschi dal mito al mistero" (Filippo Brunelleschi from myth to the mystery). "Catalog of an exhibition held at the Palazzo Strozzi, Florence, July 19-Aug. 12, 1986."
Fotografie 1950–1980. Milan: F. Motta, 1993. . Edited by Giovanni Chiaramonte.

Exhibitions

First Biennial International Photographic Exhibition, Venice, 1957.

Collections
Monti's work is held in the following permanent collection:
Sforza Castle Pinacoteca, Sforza Castle Museums, Milan

Gallery

References

Italian photographers
1908 births
1982 deaths
Architectural photographers
People from Novara
Bocconi University alumni